The Everlasting may refer to:

 "The Everlasting" (song), a 1998 song by Manic Street Preachers
 The Everlasting (album), an album by Loudness
 The Everlasting (role-playing game), a role-playing game created by Steve Brown